UD or ud may refer to:

Companies
 UD Trucks, a Japanese truck manufacturer
 United Devices, a commercial distributed computing company
 United Distillers, a whiskey holding company
 Upper Deck, a manufacturer of collectibles and trading cards
 Hex'Air (IATA airline designator UD), a French regional airline

Organizations
 Unificación Democrática, the Democratic Unification political party in Honduras
 Unión Democrática, a political party in Guatemala
 Unlock Democracy, a British political organization
 Utenriksdepartementet, the Norwegian Ministry of Foreign Affairs
 Utrikesdepartementet, the Swedish Ministry of Foreign Affairs

Schools

U.S.
 University of Dallas, Texas
 University of Dayton, Ohio
 University of Delaware
 University of Dubuque, Iowa
 University of Detroit Mercy, a Catholic university in Michigan
 University of Detroit Jesuit High School and Academy, a Catholic secondary school in Michigan

Elsewhere
 University of Dammam, Saudi Arabia
 University of Dublin, Ireland
 University of Durham, U.K.

Other
 , an abbreviation of the Spanish personal pronoun 
 Udonis Haslem, American basketball player nicknamed UD and Captain UD
 Ud (cuneiform), a sign in cuneiform writing
 Universal Dependencies, a project in analyzing syntax
 Unanimous decision, in combat sports
 Unlawful detainer, or eviction, in property law
 Urban Dictionary, a crowdsourced online slang dictionary

See also
 Oud, sometimes spelled as ud